Six referendums were held in Switzerland in 1986. The first was held on 16 March on joining the United Nations, but was rejected by 76% of voters. The next three were held on 29 September on popular initiatives on culture and vocational education and a federal resolution on the domestic sugar economy. All three were rejected, including the counter-proposal to the culture initiative.

The final two referendums were held on 7 December on popular initiatives "for the protection of tenants" and "for a just taxation of truck traffic." The tenant proposal was approved, whilst the vehicle taxation initiative was rejected.

Results

March: UN membership

September: Culture

September: Vocational education

September: Domestic sugar economy

December: Tenant protection

December: Vehicle taxation

References

1986 referendums
1986 in Switzerland
Referendums in Switzerland